Greene Carrier Bronson (November 17, 1789 in Simsbury, Hartford County, Connecticut – September 3, 1863 in Saratoga, New York) was an American lawyer and politician from New York.

Life
He was the son of Oliver Bronson (1746–1815, a music teacher and publisher) and Sarah Merrill Bronson (1754–1825). About 1802, the family removed from Simsbury to Cazenovia which was then in Oneida County, New York.

He was Surrogate of Oneida County from 1819 to 1821. He was a member of the New York State Assembly (Oneida and Oswego Co.) in 1822.

He was New York Attorney General from 1829 to 1836. He was an associate justice of the New York Supreme Court from 1836 to 1845, and chief justice from 1845 to 1847. He was one of the first four judges elected to the New York Court of Appeals at the 1847 New York special judicial election, and was Chief Judge from 1850 to 1851 when he resigned. Bronson was among the founders of Albany Law School.

In 1853, he was appointed Collector of the Port of New York. At the 1854 New York state election, he ran on the Hard Democratic ticket for Governor of New York, but came in last of the four candidates of the major parties.

From 1860 to 1862, he was Corporation Counsel of the City of New York.

He died on September 3, 1863, in Saratoga, New York; and was buried at Green-Wood Cemetery in Brooklyn.

Sources

 Death notice, in NYT on September 4, 1863
 NY Court of Appeal history
 Portrait and short bio, at NY Court history
 His funeral, in NYT on September 8, 1863
Google Books Genealogical History of the Early Settlers of West Simsbury by Abiel Brown (page 12, Case, Tiffany & Co., Hartford CT, 1856)
 Bronson genealogy, at rootsweb
Google Books The New York Civil List compiled by Franklin Benjamin Hough (pages 37, 261, 346, 347 and 415; Weed, Parsons and Co., 1858)

External links

New York State Attorneys General
Chief Judges of the New York Court of Appeals
Members of the New York State Assembly
New York Supreme Court Justices
Collectors of the Port of New York
People from Simsbury, Connecticut
Burials at Green-Wood Cemetery
1789 births
1863 deaths
19th-century American politicians
19th-century American judges